These are the results of 2019 BWF World Senior Championships' 75+ events.

Men's singles

Seeds 
  Paweł Gasz (silver medalist)
  Akira Hirota (bronze medalist)
  Roger Baldwin (quarterfinals)
  Seri Chintanaseri (gold medalist)

Finals

Top half

Section 1

Section 2

Bottom half

Section 3

Section 4

Women's singles

Seeds 
  Renate Gabriel (gold medalist)
  Beryl Goodall (group stage)

Group A

Group B

Finals

Men's doubles

Seeds 
  Akira Hirota / Shinjiro Matsuda (bronze medalists)
  Paweł Gasz / Leopold Tukendorf (silver medalists)

Group A

Group B

Group C

Group D

Finals

Women's doubles

Seed 
  Beryl Goodall / Mary Jenner (gold medalists)

Draw

Mixed doubles

Seeds 
  Paweł Gasz /  Beryl Goodall (silver medalists)
  Knut-Olof Åkesson /  Mary Jenner (group stage)

Group A

Group B

Finals

References 
Men's singles
Women's singles
Men's doubles
Women's doubles
Mixed doubles

2019 BWF World Senior Championships